Carbondale Hill is a summit in Alberta, Canada.

Carbondale Hill was so named on account of coal-mining activities; coal is a carbon-based fuel.

References

Hills of Alberta